This is a comprehensive listing of the bird species recorded in Denali National Park and Preserve, which is in the U.S. state of Alaska. Unless otherwise noted, this list is based on one published by the National Park Service (NPS) dated October 2020.

This list is presented in the taxonomic sequence of the Check-list of North and Middle American Birds, 7th edition through the 63rd Supplement, published by the American Ornithological Society (AOS). Common and scientific names are also those of the Check-list, except that the common names of families are from the Clements taxonomy because the AOS list does not include them.

This list contains 184 species. Unless otherwise noted, all are considered to occur regularly in Denali National Park and Preserve as permanent residents, summer or winter visitors, or migrants. The following codes and definitions are used by the NPS checklist to annotate some species. When abundance varies by season, this list uses the code for the season of greatest abundance.

(R) = Rare - "occurs regularly, but in small numbers" (20 species)
(O) = Occasional - "has been recorded no more than a few times and is beyond the periphery of normal annual range" (15 species)
(X) = Accidental - "has been recorded one or two times and is so far beyond the periphery of normal annual range that reoccurrence is unlikely" (15 species)
(H) = Hypothetical - "No satisfactory records exist...in Denali, but the species has either been recorded near the park and/or recorded within the park with some uncertainty" (17 species)

Ducks, geese, and waterfowl
Order: AnseriformesFamily: Anatidae

The family Anatidae includes the ducks and most duck-like waterfowl, such as geese and swans. These birds are adapted to an aquatic existence with webbed feet, bills which are flattened to a greater or lesser extent, and feathers that are excellent at shedding water due to special oils.

Snow goose, Anser caerulescens
Greater white-fronted goose, Anser albifrons
Brant, Branta bernicla (X)
Canada goose, Branta canadensis (R)
Trumpeter swan, Cygnus buccinator
Tundra swan, Cygnus columbianus
Blue-winged teal, Spatula discors (R)
Northern shoveler, Spatula clypeata
Gadwall, Mareca strepera (O)
Eurasian wigeon, Mareca penelope (O)
American wigeon, Mareca americana
Mallard, Anas platyrhynchos
Northern pintail, Anas acuta
Green-winged teal, Anas crecca
Canvasback, Aythya valisineria (R)
Redhead, Aythya americana (R)
Ring-necked duck, Aythya collaris
Greater scaup, Aythya marila
Lesser scaup, Aythya affinis
Harlequin duck, Histrionicus histrionicus
Surf scoter, Melanitta perspicillata
White-winged scoter, Melanitta deglandi
Black scoter, Melanitta americana
Long-tailed duck, Clangula hyemalis
Bufflehead, Bucephala albeola
Common goldeneye, Bucephala clangula
Barrow's goldeneye, Bucephala islandica
Hooded merganser, Lophodytes cucullatus (H)
Common merganser, Mergus merganser (R)
Red-breasted merganser, Mergus serrator
Ruddy duck, Oxyura jamaicensis (H)

Pheasants, grouse, and allies
Order: GalliformesFamily: Phasianidae

Phasianidae consists of the pheasants and their allies. These are terrestrial species, variable in size but generally plump with broad relatively short wings. Many species are gamebirds or have been domesticated as a food source for humans.

Ruffed grouse, Bonasa umbellus (R)
Spruce grouse, Canachites canadensis
Willow ptarmigan, Lagopus lagopus
Rock ptarmigan, Lagopus muta
White-tailed ptarmigan, Lagopus leucurus
Sharp-tailed grouse, Tympanuchus phasianellus (H)

Grebes
Order: PodicipediformesFamily: Podicipedidae

Grebes are small to medium-large freshwater diving birds. They have lobed toes and are excellent swimmers and divers. However, they have their feet placed far back on the body, making them quite ungainly on land.

Horned grebe, Podiceps auritus
Red-necked grebe, Podiceps grisegena

Pigeons and doves
Order: ColumbiformesFamily: Columbidae

Pigeons and doves are stout-bodied birds with short necks and short slender bills with a fleshy cere.

Mourning dove, Zenaida macroura (H)

Hummingbirds
Order: ApodiformesFamily: Trochilidae

Hummingbirds are small birds capable of hovering in mid-air due to the rapid flapping of their wings. They are the only birds that can fly backwards.

Rufous hummingbird, Selasphorus rufus (O)

Cranes
Order: GruiformesFamily: Gruidae

Cranes are large, long-legged, and long-necked birds. Unlike the similar-looking but unrelated herons, cranes fly with necks outstretched, not pulled back. Most have elaborate and noisy courting displays or "dances".

Sandhill crane, Antigone canadensis

Plovers and lapwings
Order: CharadriiformesFamily: Charadriidae

The family Charadriidae includes the plovers, dotterels, and lapwings. They are small to medium-sized birds with compact bodies, short thick necks, and long, usually pointed, wings. They are found in open country worldwide, mostly in habitats near water.

Black-bellied plover, Pluvialis squatarola (O)
American golden-plover, Pluvialis dominica
Killdeer, Charadrius vociferus (O)
Semipalmated plover, Charadrius semipalmatus

Sandpipers and allies
Order: CharadriiformesFamily: Scolopacidae

Scolopacidae is a large diverse family of small to medium-sized shorebirds including the sandpipers, curlews, godwits, shanks, tattlers, woodcocks, snipes, dowitchers, and phalaropes. The majority of these species eat small invertebrates picked out of the mud or soil. Different lengths of legs and bills enable multiple species to feed in the same habitat, particularly on the coast, without direct competition for food.

Upland sandpiper, Bartramia longicauda
Whimbrel, Numenius phaeopus
Hudsonian godwit, Limosa haemastica (X)
Ruddy turnstone, Arenaria interpres (X)
Black turnstone, Arenaria melanocephala (X)
Surfbird, Calidris virgata
Sanderling, Calidris alba (X)
Dunlin, Calidris alpina (R)
Baird's sandpiper, Calidris bairdii
Least sandpiper, Calidris minutilla
Pectoral sandpiper, Calidris melanotos
Semipalmated sandpiper, Calidris pusilla
Western sandpiper, Calidris mauri (R)
Short-billed dowitcher, Limnodromus griseus (H)
Long-billed dowitcher, Limnodromus scolopaceus
Wilson's snipe, Gallinago delicata
Spotted sandpiper, Actitis macularia
Solitary sandpiper, Tringa solitaria
Wandering tattler, Tringa incana
Lesser yellowlegs, Tringa flavipes
Greater yellowlegs, Tringa melanoleuca
Wilson's phalarope, Phalaropus tricolor (H)
Red-necked phalarope, Phalaropus lobatus
Red phalarope, Phalaropus fulicarius (X)

Skuas and jaegers
Order: CharadriiformesFamily: Stercorariidae

Jaegers and skuas are in general medium to large birds, typically with gray or brown plumage, often with white markings on the wings. They have longish bills with hooked tips and webbed feet with sharp claws. They look like large dark gulls, but have a fleshy cere above the upper mandible. They are strong, acrobatic fliers.

Pomarine jaeger, Stercorarius pomarinus (X)
Long-tailed jaeger, Stercorarius longicaudus

Auks, murres, and puffins
Order: CharadriiformesFamily: Alcidae

The family Alcidae includes auks, murres, and puffins. These are short-winged birds that live on the open sea and normally only come ashore for breeding.

Long-billed murrelet, Brachyramphus perdix (X)

Gulls, terns, and skimmers
Order: CharadriiformesFamily: Laridae

Laridae is a family of medium to large seabirds and includes gulls, terns, kittiwakes, and skimmers. They are typically gray or white, often with black markings on the head or wings. They have stout, longish bills and webbed feet.

Sabine's gull, Xema sabini (H)
Bonaparte's gull, Chroicocephalus philadelphia
Short-billed gull, Larus brachyrinchcus
California gull, Larus californicus (H)
Herring gull, Larus argentatus (R)
Glaucous-winged gull, Larus glaucescens (R)
Glaucous gull, Larus hyperboreus (H)
Arctic tern, Sterna paradisaea

Loons
Order: GaviiformesFamily: Gaviidae

Loons are aquatic birds the size of a large duck, to which they are unrelated. Their plumage is largely gray or black, and they have spear-shaped bills. Loons swim well and fly adequately, but are almost hopeless on land, because their legs are placed towards the rear of the body.

Red-throated loon, Gavia stellata
Pacific loon, Gavia pacifica (R)
Common loon, Gavia immer
Yellow-billed loon, Gavia adamsii (O)

Osprey
Order: AccipitriformesFamily: Pandionidae

Pandionidae is a monotypic family of fish-eating birds of prey.  Its single species possesses a very large and powerful hooked beak, strong legs, strong talons, and keen eyesight.

Osprey, Pandion haliaetus (R)

Hawks, eagles, and kites
Order: AccipitriformesFamily: Accipitridae

Accipitridae is a family of birds of prey, which includes hawks, eagles, kites, harriers, and Old World vultures. These birds have very large powerful hooked beaks for tearing flesh from their prey, strong legs, powerful talons, and keen eyesight.

Golden eagle, Aquila chrysaetos
Northern harrier, Circus hudsonius
Sharp-shinned hawk, Accipiter striatus
Northern goshawk, Accipiter gentilis
Bald eagle, Haliaeetus leucocephalus
Swainson's hawk, Buteo swainsoni (O)
Red-tailed hawk, Buteo jamaicensis
Rough-legged hawk, Buteo lagopus

Owls
Order: StrigiformesFamily: Strigidae

Typical owls are small to large solitary nocturnal birds of prey. They have large forward-facing eyes and ears, a hawk-like beak, and a conspicuous circle of feathers around each eye called a facial disk.

Great horned owl, Bubo virginianus
Snowy owl, Bubo scandiacus (O)
Northern hawk owl, Surnia ulula
Great gray owl, Strix nebulosa (R)
Short-eared owl, Asio flammeus
Boreal owl, Aegolius funereus

Kingfishers
Order: CoraciiformesFamily: Alcedinidae

Kingfishers are medium-sized birds with large heads, long, pointed bills, short legs, and stubby tails.

Belted kingfisher, Megaceryle alcyon

Woodpeckers
Order: PiciformesFamily: Picidae

Woodpeckers are small to medium-sized birds with chisel-like beaks, short legs, stiff tails, and long tongues used for capturing insects. Some species have feet with two toes pointing forward and two backward, while several species have only three toes. Many woodpeckers have the habit of tapping noisily on tree trunks with their beaks.

American three-toed woodpecker, Picoides dorsalis
Black-backed woodpecker, Picoides arcticus (O)
Downy woodpecker, Dryobates pubescens (R)
Hairy woodpecker, Dryobates villosus (R)
Northern flicker, Colaptes auratusFalcons and caracaras
Order: FalconiformesFamily: Falconidae

Falconidae is a family of diurnal birds of prey, notably the falcons and caracaras. They differ from hawks, eagles, and kites in that they kill with their beaks instead of their talons.

American kestrel, Falco sparveriusMerlin, Falco columbariusGyrfalcon, Falco rusticolusPeregrine falcon, Falco peregrinus (R)

Tyrant flycatchers
Order: PasseriformesFamily: Tyrannidae

Tyrant flycatchers are Passerine birds which occur throughout North and South America. They superficially resemble the Old World flycatchers, but are more robust and have stronger bills. They do not have the sophisticated vocal capabilities of the songbirds. Most, but not all, are rather plain. As the name implies, most are insectivorous.

Western kingbird, Tyrannus verticalis (H)
Eastern kingbird, Tyrannus tyrannus (H)
Olive-sided flycatcher, Contopus cooperiWestern wood-pewee, Contopus sordidulusYellow-bellied flycatcher, Empidonax flaviventris (X)
Alder flycatcher, Empidonax alnorumHammond's flycatcher, Empidonax hammondii (R)
Black phoebe, Sayornis nigricans (X)
Say's phoebe, Sayornis sayaVireos, shrike-babblers, and erpornis
Order: PasseriformesFamily: Vireonidae

The vireos are a group of small to medium-sized passerine birds restricted to the New World. They are typically greenish in color and resemble wood-warblers apart from their heavier bills.

Red-eyed vireo, Vireo olivaceus (X)

Shrikes
Order: PasseriformesFamily: Laniidae

Shrikes are passerine birds known for their habit of catching other birds and small animals and impaling the uneaten portions of their bodies on thorns. A shrike's beak is hooked, like that of a typical bird of prey.

Northern shrike, Lanius borealisCrows, jays, and magpies
Order: PasseriformesFamily: Corvidae

The family Corvidae includes crows, ravens, jays, choughs, magpies, treepies, nutcrackers, and ground jays. Corvids are above average in size among the Passeriformes, and some of the larger species show high levels of intelligence.

Canada jay, Perisoreus canadensisSteller's jay, Cyanocitta stelleri (O)
Black-billed magpie, Pica hudsoniaCommon raven, Corvus coraxTits, chickadees, and titmice
Order: PasseriformesFamily: Paridae

The Paridae are mainly small stocky woodland species with short stout bills. Some have crests. They are adaptable birds, with a mixed diet including seeds and insects.

Black-capped chickadee, Poecile atricapillaBoreal chickadee, Poecile hudsonicaGray-headed chickadee, Poecile cinctus (H)

Larks
Order: PasseriformesFamily: Alaudidae

Larks are small terrestrial birds with often extravagant songs and display flights. Most larks are fairly dull in appearance. Their food is insects and seeds.

Horned lark, Eremophila alpestrisSwallows
Order: PasseriformesFamily: Hirundinidae

The family Hirundinidae is a group of passerines characterized by their adaptation to aerial feeding. These adaptations include a slender streamlined body, long pointed wings, and short bills with a wide gape. The feet are adapted to perching rather than walking, and the front toes are partially joined at the base.

Bank swallow, Riparia ripariaTree swallow, Tachycineta bicolorViolet-green swallow, Tachycineta thalassinaBarn swallow, Hirundo rustica (R)
Cliff swallow, Petrochelidon pyrrhonotaLeaf warblers
Order: PasseriformesFamily: Phylloscopidae

Leaf warblers are a family of small insectivorous birds found mostly in Eurasia and ranging into Wallacea and Africa. The Arctic warbler breeds east into Alaska. The species are of various sizes, often green-plumaged above and yellow below, or more subdued with grayish-green to grayish-brown colors.

Arctic warbler, Phylloscopus borealisKinglets
Order: PasseriformesFamily: Regulidae

The kinglets are a small family of birds which resemble the titmice. They are very small insectivorous birds in the genus Regulus. The adults have colored crowns, giving rise to their names.

Ruby-crowned kinglet, Corthylio calendulaGolden-crowned kinglet, Regulus satrapa (O)

Waxwings
Order: PasseriformesFamily: Bombycillidae

The waxwings are a group of birds with soft silky plumage and unique red tips to some of the wing feathers. In the Bohemian and cedar waxwings, these tips look like sealing wax and give the group its name. These are arboreal birds of northern forests. They live on insects in summer and berries in winter.

Bohemian waxwing, Bombycilla garrulusNuthatches
Order: PasseriformesFamily: Sittidae

Nuthatches are small woodland birds. They have the unusual ability to climb down trees head first, unlike other birds which can only go upwards. Nuthatches have big heads, short tails, and powerful bills and feet.

Red-breasted nuthatch, Sitta canadensis (R)

Treecreepers
Order: PasseriformesFamily: Certhiidae

Treecreepers are small woodland birds, brown above and white below. They have thin pointed down-curved bills, which they use to extricate insects from bark. They have stiff tail feathers, like woodpeckers, which they use to support themselves on vertical trees.

Brown creeper, Certhia americana (O)

Starlings
Order: PasseriformesFamily: Sturnidae

Starlings are small to medium-sized passerine birds. They are medium-sized passerines with strong feet. Their flight is strong and direct and they are very gregarious. Their preferred habitat is fairly open country, and they eat insects and fruit. Plumage is typically dark with a metallic sheen.

European starling, Sturnus vulgaris (Introduced to North America) (X)

Dippers
Order: PasseriformesFamily: Cinclidae

Dippers are small, stout, birds that feed in cold, fast moving streams.

American dipper, Cinclus mexicanusThrushes and allies
Order: PasseriformesFamily: Turdidae

The thrushes are a group of passerine birds that occur mainly but not exclusively in the Old World. They are plump, soft plumaged, small to medium-sized insectivores or sometimes omnivores, often feeding on the ground. Many have attractive songs.

Mountain bluebird, Sialia currucoides (H)
Townsend's solitaire, Myadestes townsendiGray-cheeked thrush, Catharus minimusSwainson's thrush, Catharus ustulatusHermit thrush, Catharus guttatusAmerican robin, Turdus migratoriusVaried thrush, Ixoreus naeviusOld World flycatchers
Order: PasseriformesFamily: Muscicapidae

This a large family of small passerine birds restricted to the Old World. Most of the species below only occur in North America as vagrants. The appearance of these birds is highly varied, but they mostly have weak songs and harsh calls.

Northern wheatear, Oenanthe oenantheWagtails and pipits
Order: PasseriformesFamily: Motacillidae

Motacillidae is a family of small passerine birds with medium to long tails. They include the wagtails, longclaws, and pipits. They are slender ground-feeding insectivores of open country.

Eastern yellow wagtail, Motacilla tschutschensis (H)
White wagtail, Motacilla alba (H)
American pipit, Anthus rubescensFinches, euphonias, and allies
Order: PasseriformesFamily: Fringillidae

Finches are seed-eating passerine birds, that are small to moderately large and have a strong beak, usually conical and in some species very large. All have twelve tail feathers and nine primaries. These birds have a bouncing flight with alternating bouts of flapping and gliding on closed wings, and most sing well.

Pine grosbeak, Pinicola enucleatorGray-crowned rosy-finch, Leucosticte tephrocotisPurple finch, Haemorhous purpureus (H)
Common redpoll, Acanthis flammeaHoary redpoll, Acanthis hornemanni (R)
White-winged crossbill, Loxia leucopteraPine siskin, Spinus pinusLongspurs and snow buntings
Order: PasseriformesFamily: Calcariidae

The Calcariidae are a group of passerine birds that had been traditionally grouped with the New World sparrows, but differ in a number of respects and are usually found in open grassy areas.

Lapland longspur, Calcarius lapponicusSmith's longspur, Calcarius pictus (O)
Snow bunting, Plectrophenax nivalisNew World sparrows
Order: PasseriformesFamily: Passerellidae

Until 2017, these species were considered part of the family Emberizidae. Most of the species are known as sparrows, but these birds are not closely related to the Old World sparrows which are in the family Passeridae. Many of these have distinctive head patterns.

Fox sparrow, Passerella iliacaAmerican tree sparrow, Spizelloides arboreaDark-eyed junco, Junco hyemalisWhite-crowned sparrow, Zonotrichia leucophrysGolden-crowned sparrow, Zonotrichia atricapillaSavannah sparrow, Passerculus sandwichensisLincoln's sparrow, Melospiza lincolniiTroupials and allies
Order: PasseriformesFamily: Icteridae

The icterids are a group of small to medium-sized, often colorful passerine birds restricted to the New World and include the grackles, New World blackbirds, and New World orioles. Most species have black as a predominant plumage color, often enlivened by yellow, orange, or red.

Red-winged blackbird, Agelaius phoeniceus (O)
Rusty blackbird, Euphagus carolinusBrown-headed cowbird, Molothrus ater (X)

New World warblers
Order: PasseriformesFamily: Parulidae

The wood-warblers are a group of small often colorful passerine birds restricted to the New World. Most are arboreal, but some like the ovenbird and the two waterthrushes are more terrestrial. Most members of this family are insectivores.

Northern waterthrush, Parkesia noveboracensisTennessee warbler, Leiothlypis peregrina (H)
Orange-crowned warbler, Leiothlypis celataAmerican redstart, Setophaga ruticilla (O)
Yellow warbler, Setophaga petechiaBlackpoll warbler, Setophaga striataYellow-rumped warbler, Setophaga coronataTownsend's warbler, Setophaga townsendi (X)
Wilson's warbler, Cardellina pusillaCardinals and allies
Order: PasseriformesFamily: Cardinalidae

The cardinals are a family of robust seed-eating birds with strong bills. They are typically associated with open woodland. The sexes usually have distinct plumages.

Western tanager, Piranga ludoviciana'' (X)

References

See also
List of birds of Alaska
List of birds
Lists of birds by region
List of North American birds

Denali National Park and Preserve
birds
Alaska, Denali